Gutch Common is a 35.1 hectare biological Site of Special Scientific Interest in Wiltshire, notified in 1951.

Sources

 Natural England citation sheet for the site (accessed 1 March 2022)

External links
 Natural England website (SSSI information)

Sites of Special Scientific Interest in Wiltshire
Sites of Special Scientific Interest notified in 1951